Alexander or Aleksandr  Chumakov may refer to:

 Aleksandr Chumakov (footballer) (1948–2012), Soviet footballer
 Alexander N. Chumakov (born 1950), Russian philosopher, theoretician of science and scientific community organizer
 Aleksandr Chumakov (sailor) (1927–2019), Russian sailor
 Aleksandr Petrovich Chumakov (born 1941), Belarusian Army general and former Minister of Defence of Belarus